Supreme Security Committee can refer to one of two bodies formed in the wake of unrest from the Arab Spring and Winter uprisings:
 Ministry of Interior (Libya), led temporarily by a Supreme Security Committee formed after the 2011 civil war
 Supreme Security Committee (Yemen), formed by Houthi rebels after the 2015 coup